Žiga Jerman (born 26 June 1998) is a Slovenian former racing cyclist, who competed as a professional from 2017 to 2022.

Major results

2015
 2nd Gran Premio dell'Arno
 5th Piccola SanRemo
 5th Trofeo Pietro Merelli
2016
 1st Trofeo Pietro Merelli
 2nd Road race, National Junior Road Championships
 6th Road race, UCI Junior Road World Championships
2017
 1st Stage 2 Tour de Hongrie
 2nd GP Kranj
 5th Umag Trophy
2018
 1st Ghent–Wevelgem U23
 2nd Gran Premio della Liberazione
 5th ZLM Tour
2019
 2nd Entre Brenne et Montmorillonnais
 3rd Grand Prix Criquielion
 5th Étoile d'or
 6th Ronde van Vlaanderen Beloften
2020
 8th Poreč Trophy
2021
 7th Overall Belgrade Banjaluka

Notes

References

External links

1998 births
Living people
Slovenian male cyclists
European Games competitors for Slovenia
Cyclists at the 2019 European Games
Sportspeople from Ljubljana
Competitors at the 2018 Mediterranean Games
Mediterranean Games competitors for Slovenia